Soamatasy is a town and commune in Madagascar. It belongs to the district of Ihosy, which is a part of Ihorombe Region. The population of the commune was estimated to be approximately 3,000 in 2001 commune census.

Only primary schooling is available. The majority 55% of the population of the commune are farmers, while an additional 43% receives their livelihood from raising livestock. The most important crops are rice and beans, while other important agricultural products are peanuts, maize and cassava. Services provide employment for 2% of the population.

References and notes 

Populated places in Ihorombe